The following outline is provided as an overview of and topical guide to the Soviet Union:

Soviet Union – was a socialist state on the Eurasian continent that existed from 1922 to 1991. A union of multiple subnational Soviet republics, its government and economy were highly centralized. The Soviet Union was a one-party state, governed by the Communist Party with Moscow as its capital. It was a major ally during World War II, a main participant in the Cold War, and it grew in power to become one of the world's two superpowers (the other being the United States). The Soviet Union collapsed in 1991.

General reference 
 Common English country name(s): Soviet Union
 Official names of the Soviet Union
 Official English country name: Union of Soviet Socialist Republics (USSR)
 Nicknames
 "Ash Heap of History" (coined by Ronald Reagan)
 "Evil Empire" (coined by Ronald Reagan)
 Common endonym(s):  
 Official endonym(s):  
 Adjectival(s): 
 Demonym(s):

Geography of the Soviet Union 

Geography of the Soviet Union
 The Soviet Union was a: country
 Population of the Soviet Union: 
 Area of the Soviet Union:  
 Atlas of the Soviet Union

Location 

 Soviet Union was situated within the following regions:
 Eurasia
 Europe
 Eastern Europe
 Asia
 North Asia
 Time zone(s):
 Extreme points of the Soviet Union

Environment of the Soviet Union 

Environment of the Soviet Union
 Climate of the Soviet Union
 Ecology of the Soviet Union
 Ecoregions in the Soviet Union
 Renewable energy in the Soviet Union
 Geology of the Soviet Union

Natural geographic features of the Soviet Union 

Landforms of the Soviet Union
 Bodies of water of the Soviet Union
 Caspian Sea
 Lakes of the Soviet Union
 Islands of the Soviet Union
 Mountains of the Soviet Union
 Caucasus Mountains
 Ural Mountains
 Rivers of the Soviet Union
 Waterfalls of the Soviet Union
 Valleys of the Soviet Union
 West Siberian Plain
 World Heritage Sites in the Soviet Union

Regions of the Soviet Union 

Regions of the Soviet Union

 Caspian Sea
 Caucasus Mountains
 European Russia
 North Caucasus
 Siberia
 Ural Mountains
 West Siberian Plain

Ecoregions of the Soviet Union 

Ecoregions in the Soviet Union

Administrative divisions of the Soviet Union 

Subdivisions of the Soviet Union
 Republics of the Soviet Union
 Autonomous Soviet Socialist Republics of the Soviet Union
 Oblasts of the Soviet Union
 Autonomous oblasts of the Soviet Union
 Autonomous okrugs
 Closed city
 List of closed cities
 Capital of the Soviet Union: Capital of the Soviet Union

Demography of the Soviet Union 

Demographics of the Soviet Union
 Soviet people
 Languages of the Soviet Union
 Religion in the Soviet Union
 Crime in the Soviet Union
 1989 Soviet Census

Government and politics of the Soviet Union 

Politics of the Soviet Union

 Form of government: One-party state
 Capital of the Soviet Union: Capital of the Soviet Union
 Elections in the Soviet Union

Ideologies of the Soviet Union 

Political ideologies of the Soviet Union
 Ideology of the Communist Party of the Soviet Union
 State ideology of the Soviet Union
 Marxism–Leninism
 Leninism
 Brezhnevism

Repression in the Soviet Union

Ideological repression in the Soviet Union 

Ideological repression in the Soviet Union
 Religion in the Soviet Union 
 Suppressed research in the Soviet Union 
 Censorship in the Soviet Union 
 Censorship of images in the Soviet Union

Political repression in the Soviet Union 

Political repression in the Soviet Union
 Red Terror 
 Collectivization in the Soviet Union 
 Great Purge 
 Population transfer in the Soviet Union 
 Gulag 
 List of Gulag camps
 Holodomor 
 Political abuse of psychiatry in the Soviet Union

Political parties of the Soviet Union 

Political parties in the Soviet Union
 Communist Party of the Soviet Union
 Ideology of the Communist Party of the Soviet Union
 Organization of the Communist Party of the Soviet Union
 Central Committee of the Communist Party of the Soviet Union
 Politburo of the Communist Party of the Soviet Union
 Secretariat of the Communist Party of the Soviet Union
 Congress of the Communist Party of the Soviet Union
 General Secretary of the Communist Party of the Soviet Union

Branches of the government of the Soviet Union 

Government of the Soviet Union

 Collective leadership in the Soviet Union

Governmental bodies
 Congress of Soviets 
 Supreme Soviet 
 Congress of People's Deputies 
 Supreme Court of the Soviet UnionSubdivisions of the Soviet Union

Executive branch of the government of the Soviet Union 

 Head of state: President of the Soviet Union, 
 Presidential Council of the Soviet Union (1990)
 State Council of the Soviet Union (1991)
 Head of government: Premier of the Soviet Union, 
 List of leaders of the Soviet Union
 Collective leadership in the Soviet Union
 List of Governments of the Soviet Union
 Deputy Premier of the Soviet Union
 First Deputy Premier of the Soviet Union
 Cabinet of the Soviet Union

Soviet security services 

Soviet security services
 Cheka
 State Political Directorate
 NKVD 
 Ministry of Internal Affairs (Russia)
 Ministry of State Security (Soviet Union) 
 KGB

Legislative branch of the government of the Soviet Union 

 Parliament of the Soviet Union (bicameral)
 Upper house: Soviet of Nationalities
 Lower house: Soviet of the Union

Judicial branch of the government of the Soviet Union 

Court system of the Soviet Union

 Supreme Court of the Soviet Union

Foreign relations of the Soviet Union 

Foreign relations of the Soviet Union
 Brezhnev Doctrine
 Passport system in the Soviet Union

Law and order in the Soviet Union 

Law of the Soviet Union
 Capital punishment in the Soviet Union
 Constitution of the Soviet Union
 Crime in the Soviet Union
 Human rights in the Soviet Union
 LGBT rights in the Soviet Union

Military of the Soviet Union 

Military of the Soviet Union
 Command
 Commander-in-chief: 
 Ministry of Defence of the Soviet Union
 Forces
 Army of the Soviet Union
 Navy of the Soviet Union
 Air Force of the Soviet Union
 Special forces of the Soviet Union
 Military history of the Soviet Union
 Military ranks of the Soviet Union

Local government in the Soviet Union 

Local government in the Soviet Union

General history of the Soviet Union 

History of the Soviet Union

General history of the Soviet Union, by period 

History of the Soviet Union
 Russian Revolution (1917)
 February Revolution
 October Revolution
 Russian Civil War
 Russian Soviet Federative Socialist Republic
 Treaty on the Creation of the USSR
 New Economic Policy
 Stalinism
 Great Purge
 Soviet Union in World War II
 Cold War
 Khrushchev Thaw
 1965 Soviet economic reform
 Era of Stagnation
 Perestroika
 Glasnost
 Revolutions of 1989
 Dissolution of the Soviet Union 
 Nostalgia for the Soviet Union
 Post-Soviet states
 Cold War II

History of the Soviet Union, by year 

 1922 in the Soviet Union
 1923 in the Soviet Union
 1924 in the Soviet Union
 1925 in the Soviet Union
 1926 in the Soviet Union
 1927 in the Soviet Union
 1928 in the Soviet Union
 1929 in the Soviet Union
 1930 in the Soviet Union
 1931 in the Soviet Union
 1932 in the Soviet Union
 1933 in the Soviet Union
 1934 in the Soviet Union
 1935 in the Soviet Union
 1936 in the Soviet Union
 1937 in the Soviet Union
 1938 in the Soviet Union
 1939 in the Soviet Union
 1940 in the Soviet Union
 1941 in the Soviet Union
 1942 in the Soviet Union
 1943 in the Soviet Union
 1944 in the Soviet Union
 1945 in the Soviet Union
 1946 in the Soviet Union
 1947 in the Soviet Union
 1948 in the Soviet Union
 1949 in the Soviet Union
 1950 in the Soviet Union
 1951 in the Soviet Union
 1952 in the Soviet Union
 1953 in the Soviet Union
 1954 in the Soviet Union
 1955 in the Soviet Union
 1956 in the Soviet Union
 1957 in the Soviet Union
 1958 in the Soviet Union
 1959 in the Soviet Union
 1960 in the Soviet Union
 1961 in the Soviet Union
 1962 in the Soviet Union
 1963 in the Soviet Union
 1964 in the Soviet Union
 1965 in the Soviet Union
 1966 in the Soviet Union
 1967 in the Soviet Union
 1968 in the Soviet Union
 1969 in the Soviet Union
 1970 in the Soviet Union
 1971 in the Soviet Union
 1972 in the Soviet Union
 1973 in the Soviet Union
 1974 in the Soviet Union
 1975 in the Soviet Union
 1976 in the Soviet Union
 1977 in the Soviet Union
 1978 in the Soviet Union
 1979 in the Soviet Union
 1980 in the Soviet Union
 1981 in the Soviet Union
 1982 in the Soviet Union
 1983 in the Soviet Union
 1984 in the Soviet Union
 1985 in the Soviet Union
 1986 in the Soviet Union
 1987 in the Soviet Union
 1988 in the Soviet Union
 1989 in the Soviet Union
 1990 in the Soviet Union
 1991 in the Soviet Union

History of the Soviet Union, by region

History of the Soviet Union, by subject 

 Economic history of the Soviet Union
 History of the Jews in the Soviet Union
 Military history of the Soviet Union

Culture of the Soviet Union 

Culture of the Soviet Union
 Architecture of the Soviet Union
 Constructivist architecture
 Stalinist architecture
 Fashion in the Soviet Union
 Languages of the Soviet Union
 Media in the Soviet Union
 Propaganda in the Soviet Union
 People of the Soviet Union
 Public holidays in the Soviet Union
 World Heritage Sites in the Soviet Union

Art in the Soviet Union 

 Cinema of the Soviet Union
 Dance in the Soviet Union
 Russian ballet
 Soviet ballroom dances
 Literature of the Soviet Union
 Music of the Soviet Union
 Soviet opera
 Television in the Soviet Union

Languages of the Soviet Union 

Languages of the Soviet Union
 Linguistics of the Soviet Union

Religion in the Soviet Union 
 Religion in the Soviet Union
 Christianity in the Soviet Union
 Islam in the Soviet Union
 Judaism in the Soviet Union

Sports in the Soviet Union 

Sports in the Soviet Union
 Soviet Union at the Olympics
 Football in the Soviet Union

Symbols of the Soviet Union 

 State Anthem of the Soviet Union
 State Emblem of the Soviet Union
 Emblems of the Soviet Republics
 Flag of the Soviet Union
 Flags of the Soviet Republics

Economy and infrastructure of the Soviet Union 

Economy of the Soviet Union
 Economic rank (by nominal GDP): 
 Agriculture in the Soviet Union
 Banking in the Soviet Union
 Gosbank
 Communications in the Soviet Union
 Radio in the Soviet Union
 Internet in the Soviet Union
 .su
 Currency of the Soviet Union: Soviet ruble 
 Five-year plans of the Soviet Union
 Economic history of the Soviet Union
 Energy in the Soviet Union
 Energy policy of the Soviet Union
 Soviet inventions
 Timeline of Russian innovation#Soviet Union
 Net material product
 Transport in the Soviet Union
 Airports in the Soviet Union
 Rail transport in the Soviet Union
 Roads in the Soviet Union
 Water supply and sanitation in the Soviet Union

Education in the Soviet Union 

Education in the Soviet Union

Health in the Soviet Union

Science and technology in the Soviet Union

Science organizations in the Soviet Union 

 Communist Academy
 Russian Academy of Sciences#The Academy of Sciences of the USSR
 USSR Academy of Medical Sciences
 Lenin All-Union Academy of Agricultural Sciences
 USSR Academy of Pedagogical Sciences
 Sharashkas
 Naukograds

See also 

 Outline of Russia

 Soviet society
 Soviet people
 Soviet working class

 Politics
Opposition (politics)
 Soviet dissidents and their groups
 :Category:Soviet opposition groups

References

External links 

Impressions of Soviet Russia, by John Dewey.
Documents and other forms of media from the Soviet Union: 1917–1991.
A Country Study: Soviet Union (Former)
Soviet Union Exhibit at Global Museum on Communism with essay by Richard Pipes

the Soviet Union